George Carleton may refer to:

George Carleton (bishop) (1559–1628), bishop of Chichester
George Carleton (MP) (1529–1590), MP for Dorchester and Poole
George Carleton (actor) (1885–1950), American character actor
George Carleton (died 1590), landowner in South Holland, Lincolnshire and pioneer of fen drainage

See also
George Carleton Lacy (1888–1951), American Methodist missionary